Hydrocharis morsus-ranae, frogbit, is a flowering plant belonging to the genus Hydrocharis in the family Hydrocharitaceae. In North America, it is referred to as common frogbit or European frog's-bit to distinguish it from the related American frogbit (Limnobium spongia).

It is a small floating plant resembling a small water lily. It bears small, three-petalled white flowers. The floating leaves are kidney-shaped and grow in rosettes on the water surface, with the roots hanging down into the water column but not normally touching bottom. Frogbit is fast growing and spreads rapidly by stolons, surviving the winter as dormant turions which rest on the bottom, rising again to the surface in spring.

Frogbit is native to Europe and parts of Asia, but it was introduced to Canada in the 1930s and has become invasive in eastern Canada and the northeastern United States, particularly around the Great Lakes. It is considered a pest in this region as it colonises waterways and forms dense masses of vegetation on the surface, threatening native biodiversity, although in its native areas it is rarely dominant.

References

External links

 Invading Species.com

Hydrocharitaceae
Plants described in 1753
Taxa named by Carl Linnaeus